Mal Paharia is a language spoken by 51,000 of 110,000 ethnic Mal Paharia in the states of Jharkhand and West Bengal in India, and regions of Bangladesh. The language is also known as Mal Pahoria, Malto, Malti, Paharia, Parsi, and Mal Pahariya. It has been variously regarded as a Bengali–Assamese language, a dialect of Malto, and a mixed Dravidian–Indo-Aryan language. There is a generally positive attitude among speakers of the language towards it, but it is considered vulnerable as some speakers have shifted to Bengali. Mal Paharia uses the Devanagari script and rules for its writing, reading, and speech.

History
Mal Paharia is derived from Malto and the Bengali language. The speakers of this language originated in Jharkhand as early as 1881, and since then it has declined in popularity. According to the 1921 census, the town had Indo-European 500 speakers at that time. Industrialization and urbanization were factors in the fragmentation of the Bengali language into dialects because of the making of dams, mines, homes, and more. This caused a displacement in the population of the Indo-European speakers, which led to the emergence of Mal Paharia.

Geographic distribution
Mal Paharia is considered a Northern Dravidian language that is spoken in Northeastern India.

Official status
The regions that use Mal Pahari are Jharkhand, West Bengal, and parts of Bangladesh.

Dialects/varieties
Mal Paharia can be considered a dialect of Bengali but can also be classified separately. It is also derived from Malto, which is a more commonly used language. Mal Paharia is considered a Dravidian language, which is spoken by the people of Jharkhand and in Bangladesh.

Derived languages
Mal Paharia does not have any daughter languages, only languages that are similar to it such as Kumarbhag Paharia and Sauria Paharia.

Mal Paharia Phonology 

Since the Mal Paharia language is considered a Dravidian language, it uses the Devanagari script for writing and speaking. These tables represents the Devanagari language's phonology.

Mal Paharia Devanagari Consonants 

The aspiration of the consonants are separated by "hard" and "soft" similar to voiced and unvoiced consonants of the IPA. There are 3 sounds that due to lack of definitions and examples are hard to transcribe into IPA. There are the two retroflex flaps, (ड़) and (ढ़) which are described as "like a flapped "d", flapping tongue from retroflex to alveolar ridge position" and the same definition, but aspirated. Then there is the borrowed foreign sound of (क़), described as "like "k", but pronounced in the back of the mouth."

For the sounds /z/ and /ʤ/, there is no distinction between them in this language. They occasionally can be used inter-changeably and are considered semi-allophones. An example of true allophones are the /v/ and /w/ sounds. /v/ is occasionally pronounced as a /w/, and in this language are allophones of each other and some might pronounce a sound in between them.

The /r/ used in this language is used as a flap. There are occasional trills and can be similar to the American English /r/. The /r/ is also considered to be a "syllabic liquid" and is used as a vowel.

Mal Paharia Devanagari Vowels 

Mal Paharia Devanagari has 11 distinguished vowels. Of these vowels, a, e, i, o and u can be short or long. There is also an additional aspirated /a/ vowel.

There is also a vowel used including the consonant /m/ as /aṃ/ and /aṁ/ which is a nasalization of /a/ (अं). The /r/ (ऋ and ॠ) and /l/ (ऌ and ॡ) are considered "syllabic liquids" and are vowels as well. Due to lack of in depth research, there is no equivalent in the IPA for these sounds as vowels.

Diphthongs 
Within the Mal Paharia Devanagari language, diphthongs included are: /ai/, /aʊ/ and /oʊ/.

Script
Mal Paharia uses the Devangari script, and in the chart there are a few examples of words in writing, and translated in English. The Devangari script has 11 vowels and 33 consonants. The script is written from left to right, and it uses headstrokes on the letters. Some exceptions are; jha, tha, dha, bha, a and ā, because there is a break in the headstroke. While writing using the Devangari script, the headstroke is not always used. According to the phonetics used in Devangari script for the Mal Paharia language, vowels are ordered first, meaning each short vowel is following by a longer one. The consonants are ordered with respect to place and in rows. The 'rows' consist of; velar, palatal, retroflex, dental, labial. Each row has different rules, but within each one, the sibilants and fricatives are ordered last. Various letters take different forms when they are in  their initial/ final position. For example, the letter ra changes location depending on the preceding ya, or a consonant other than ya, or a consonant with a vertical stem/ rounded bottom.

Since Devanagari is not actually an alphabet, it uses an alphasyllabary system using vowels and consonants to form speech. Every letter represents a consonant, which is followed by a schwa vowel (अ). Diatrical marks are used to distinguish between different sounds of the vowels, since it can be used in many different ways. Conjunct consonants are used to represent combinations of sounds, thus increasing its versatility in word formation.

Devanagari uses the articulation of vowels in the mouth, when spoken. It uses five places of articulation listed in the chart below: 

Among all of the consonants and vowels, they are voiced, unvoiced, or nasal. An example is given (in the chart below) for the Devangari script with relation to the five articulation of vowels in the mouth.

References

External links
 http://glottolog.org/resource/languoid/id/malp1246
 http://www.omniglot.com/language/articles/devanagari.htm
 http://www.endangeredlanguages.com/lang/4670
https://web.archive.org/web/20030801223449/http://www.ancientscripts.com/devanagari.html
http://www.shalinibosbyshell.com/pronunciation.pdf

Eastern Indo-Aryan languages
Languages of India
Mixed languages